Jesse James' Kid (also known as Son of Jesse James) is a 1965 Spanish-Italian Spaghetti Western film directed by Antonio del Amo.

Cast
Robert Hundar as Bill James  
Mercedes Alonso as Dorothy
Adrian Hoven as Allan
Luis Induni
Roberto Camardiel
José Canalejas as Joe Kamel
Pier A. Caminnecci
José Jaspe
Raf Baldassarre as Bruce
Tomás Torres
John Bartha
Fernando Sánchez Polack
Adolfo Torrado
Robert Johnson Jr.

References

External links
 

1965 films
1960s Italian-language films
1965 Western (genre) films
Spaghetti Western films
Italian Western (genre) films
Spanish Western (genre) films
Films directed by Antonio del Amo
1960s Italian films